The Duchess Stakes is a Thoroughbred horse race run annually at Woodbine Racetrack in Toronto, Ontario, Canada. It is open to three-year-old fillies. Held during the first part of August, it is contested over a distance of 7 furlongs on Polytrack synthetic dirt. It currently offers a purse of $96,363 with an additional $50,000 for Ontario-bred horses. Previously a Grade III race, it lost its graded status in 2006.

Inaugurated in 1956 at Fort Erie Racetrack, the Duchess Stakes has also been hosted by Toronto's Greenwood Raceway. Since inception the race has been run at various distances:
 8.5 furlongs ( miles) : 1956-1966 and 1970-1979 at Fort Erie Racetrack, 1967 at Greenwood Raceway, 1969 at Woodbine Racetrack,  miles; Fort Erie; main track
 8 furlongs (1 mile) : 1968 at Greenwood Raceway
 7.5 furlongs : 2006 at Woodbine Racetrack
 7 furlongs : 1980-2005 and since 2007 at Woodbine Racetrack

Records
Speed  record: (at current distance of 7 furlongs)
 1:22.03 - Lemon Maid (2005)

Most wins by a jockey:
 4 - Todd Kabel (1992, 1994, 1999, 2005)

Most wins by a trainer:
 3 - Glenn Magnusson (1963, 1964, 1973)
 3 - John Morahan (1974, 1975, 1980)
 3 - Macdonald Benson (1978, 1996, 2008)

Most wins by an owner:
 4 - Stafford Farms (1963, 1964, 1966, 1970)

Winners

References
 The 2009 Duchess Stakes at the NTRA

Ungraded stakes races in Canada
Horse races in Canada
Flat horse races for three-year-old fillies
Recurring sporting events established in 1956
Woodbine Racetrack
Summer events in Canada
1956 establishments in Ontario